Phalaenopsis Harriettiae was the first man-made Phalaenopsis hybrid. It was registered in 1887  by John Veitch, who created it at the Veitch Nurseries. P. Harriettiae is a hybrid of the naturally occurring Phalaenopsis amabilis and Phalaenopsis violacea.

References 

Harriettiae
Veitch Nurseries
Plant nothospecies